Samantha George (born 7 August 1976) is a Canadian sprinter. She competed in the women's 4 × 400 metres relay at the 2000 Summer Olympics.

References

External links
 

1976 births
Living people
Athletes (track and field) at the 2000 Summer Olympics
Canadian female sprinters
Olympic track and field athletes of Canada
Sportspeople from Brampton
Olympic female sprinters
20th-century Canadian women